Unubahe (Unuba'e) is a nearly extinct Oceanic language spoken at the southeastern tip of Papua New Guinea. Although a few children speak it, in 2001 there was only one married couple who both spoke the language.

References

Nuclear Papuan Tip languages
Languages of Milne Bay Province
Endangered Austronesian languages
Endangered languages of Oceania